James Byres of Tonley FRSE FSAScot FSA (1733 — 1817) was a Scottish architect, antiquary and dealer in Old Master paintings and antiquities.

Biography

He was born in Aberdeenshire in 1733.

Byres was a member of a family of Scottish Jacobite sympathisers who settled in Rome in 1758, where he became a cicerone and an art dealer, mainly to Scottish and English gentlemen on the Grand Tour until his return to Scotland in 1790. His house was in Via Paolina.

Byres was a painter and an adept designer, whose Vanvitellian design for a palazzo facade won a prize from the Accademia di San Luca in 1762. In Rome members of his circle were drawn by Angelica Kauffman in a sketchbook she used from 1762 to 1764: the portraits include the English painter Nathaniel Dance, Gavin Hamilton, and the abbé Peter Grant. By 1764 he was so well acquainted with the ancient sites and the cabinets of collectors that he took about a party of colonial Americans, including Samuel Powel of Philadelphia, who unlike his British peers, took assiduous notes. Byres, as well as some others British residents in Rome such as Thomas Jenkins and Colin Morison, worked as an art dealer, working with important European collectors.

William Constable purchased from Byres many of the Italian paintings and marble copies after Roman sculptures at Burton Constable, Yorkshire, and Byres was responsible for introducing the artist Anton Maron, who painted William Constable and his sister in the pose and dress of Cato and Marcia.  Among the antiquities that passed through his hands, the most famous may be the Portland Vase, which he sold to Sir William Hamilton in 1770. Among the commissions for which he acted as agent was the Noli me Tangere of Raphael Mengs, 1771, for an altarpiece for All Souls College, 1771.

In 1783 he was one of the founder members of the Royal Society of Edinburgh.

A clear idea of his own collection can be gleaned from a 1790 inventory made upon his return to Tonley. Though he sent many of his clients to Pompeo Batoni, the only Batoni portrait hanging in his house was of his sister Isabella, Mrs Robert Sandilands.

Concerning the Etruscans Byres formulated the hypothesis that Etruscan literature has not come down to us because it was purposely destroyed by the Romans.

Before he left Rome in 1790 he made a payment to the maître d'hôtel of Henry Benedict Stuart, Cardinal York in favour of the Duchess of Albany, illegitimate daughter of Bonnie Prince Charlie, so it may be inferred that his Jacobite sensibility ran deep.

He died at Tonley in Aberdeenshire on 3 September 1817

Notes

Further reading
 P. Coen, Il mercato dei quadri a Roma nel XVIII secolo: , Florence, Leo S. Olschki, 2010, pp. 70–77
 I. Bignamini, C. Hornsby, Digging And Dealing In Eighteenth-Century Rome (2010), p. 246-248
 P. Coen, La carriera di mercante d'arte e il profilo culturale di James Byres of Tonley (1737-1824), in La città degli artisti nell’età di Pio VI, a cura di L. Barroero, S. Susinno, «Roma moderna e contemporanea», X, 2002, pp. 153–178
 Brinsley Ford, 'James Byres, principal antiquarian to the English visitors to Rome', in Apollo; 99 (June 1974), pp 446–61.
 W.T. Whitley, Artists and Their Friends in England 1700-1790 (1928) ii, pp247–48.

1734 births
1817 deaths
18th-century Scottish architects
18th-century Scottish painters
Scottish male painters
19th-century Scottish painters
British art dealers
People from Aberdeenshire
Businesspeople from Rome
Fellows of the Royal Society of Edinburgh
Fellows of the Society of Antiquaries of London
Members of the Philosophical Society of Edinburgh
Scottish antiquarians
Scottish businesspeople
Scottish designers
Scottish expatriates in Italy
Scottish Jacobites
Scottish art collectors
Fellows of the Society of Antiquaries of Scotland